Ulrich of Strasburg (c. 1225–1277) was a German Dominican theologian and scholastic philosopher from Strasbourg, Alsace. A disciple of Albertus Magnus, he is known for his Summa de Bono, written 1265 to 1272.

Works
 Ulricus de Argentina, De summo bono, I–IV, edited by A. Beccarisi et al., Corpus philosophorum teutonicorum medii aevi I, vols 1–4, Hamburgh, Meiner, 1987-2008.

References
Jorge J. E. Gracia, Timothy B. Noone (2005), A Companion to Philosophy in the Middle Ages
 Irene Zavattero, "Ulrich of Strasbourg", in Henrik Lagerlund (ed.), Encyclopedia of Medieval Philosophy: Philosophy Between 500 and 1500, Dordrecht, Springer, pp. 1351-1353.

Notes

External links

1220s births
1277 deaths
Year of birth uncertain
German Dominicans
13th-century German Catholic theologians
Scholastic philosophers
Dominican theologians
Writers from Strasbourg
13th-century Latin writers
13th-century philosophers